Peggio per me... meglio per te (Italian for Worse for me ... better for you) is a 1967 Italian "musicarello" film directed by Bruno Corbucci. It is named after Little Tony's hit song "Peggio per me".

Cast 

Little Tony: Tony Romanelli 
Katia Christine: Marisa
Gianni Agus: Baron Marcianò  
Aldo Puglisi: Giorgio De Santis 
Maria Pia Conte: Gabriella 
Leo Gavero:  Marinotti aka "Califfo" 
Lucrezia Love: Vanessa 
Antonella Steni: Adriana

References

External links

1967 films
Musicarelli
1967 musical comedy films
Films directed by Bruno Corbucci
1960s Italian-language films
1960s Italian films